George William Francis Althofer  (1903–1993) was an Australian botanist, nurseryman, author and poet, with a special interest in the mint-bush genus Prostanthera as well as other Australian native plants, who founded the Burrendong Botanic Garden and Arboretum.

Life
Althofer was born at Dripstone in the Wellington local government area of Central West New South Wales.  He attended school locally, in Dripstone, then Wellington and Mumbil.

Althofer grew up working on his father's farm and orchard, becoming an orchardist himself.  In 1938 he established a native plant nursery at his property "Nindethana" at Dripstone.  Inspired by the American example of the Arnold Arboretum, and assisted by his brother Peter, he lobbied for the establishment of a similar institution with a focus on Australian native plants.  As a consequence, the  Burrendong Botanic Garden and Arboretum on the foreshore of Lake Burrendong, near Wellington, opened in 1964.

Publications
Books and collections of poetry by Althofer include:
 1936 – The road to Burrendong and other verses
 1937 – Drifting. (Music by Edward H. Tyrrell, words by George Althofer). The Manly Daily: Sydney
 1956 – The story of Nindethana and new and enlarged catalogue of Australian native plants. Nindethana Nursery: Dripstone
 1966 – Trees to beat the droughts: being a guide to the planting of hardy species on the western slopes and plains. (With "Blue Gum" of "The Land"). Land Newspaper: Sydney
 n.d. (1970s) – The dream of Ronal and other verses
 1978 – Cradle of incense : the story of Australian Prostanthera. Stanley Smith Memorial Publication Fund: Australia.
 1980 – Ironbark chips of Stuart Town, Mumbil, Dripstone and the Burrendong region. Macquarie Publications: Dubbo.
 1980 – The flora of Mt Arthur Reserve, Wellington, N.S.W. (Illustrated by G.J. Harden). Trustees of Mt Arthur Reserve: Wellington, NSW. 
 1983 – Laughter and tears from the golden years, or, Some more ironbark chips. Macquarie Publications: Dubbo
 1985 – The Dripstone story : being a comprehensive social history of Dripstone and district, from the earliest times to the present day. Wellington Historical Society: Wellington, NSW.
 1992 – The collected poems of G. W. Althofer.

External links
 Burrendong Arboretum

References

Notes

Sources
 
 
 

1903 births
1993 deaths
20th-century Australian botanists
20th-century Australian non-fiction writers
Botanical writers
Australian orchardists
20th-century Australian poets
Australian male poets
Recipients of the Medal of the Order of Australia
20th-century Australian male writers